Freak Power was a band founded by bassist Norman Cook (later known as Fatboy Slim), Ashley Slater (the trombonist with the anarchic British jazz big band Loose Tubes), and vocalist Jesse Graham, also known as "the Bass Cadet". Their music was a mix of acid jazz, funk, soul, and trip hop. Although not credited, the London-based session bass player Dale Davis recorded bass and guitar on their debut album Drive-Thru Booty.

Discography
The single "Turn On, Tune In, Cop Out" was a minor hit on the UK Singles Chart when released in 1993. There was renewed interest in the track after TV exposure in the 1995 Levi's jeans television advert "Taxi" directed by Baillie Walsh.

The band released two albums: Drive-Thru Booty in 1994 and More of Everything for Everybody in 1996. The debut album featured the hit singles "Turn On, Tune In, Cop Out" and "Rush", released on 4th and Broadway. The title of the former is a play on Timothy Leary's "Turn on, tune in, drop out".

"Song #6" from the band's follow-up album was featured in the 2004 movie Code 46. The song "Waiting for the story to end" was used in a Norwegian beer commercial in the 1990s, for a beer from the E.C Dahls brewery in Trondheim.

Studio albums

Compilation albums

Singles

References

External links
 

English electronic music groups
Acid jazz ensembles
British musical trios